Joda is a planned industrial and modern city and municipality in the Kendujhar district of the state of Odisha, India. The area has rich iron and manganese ore deposits and the economy centers on the large-scale production of iron ore and manganese ore. The year-round river named Sona River passes through Joda city. This is the lifeline of the city, as it fulfills the water needs. It is one of the fifth scheduled areas of Odisha. According to sources, these towns have 45% to 48% Scheduled Tribes and Scheduled Castes populations.

Demographics
 Indian census, the population of Joda has been enumerated to be 46,631. Males constitute 52% of the population while females account for 48% of the population. In Joda, 16 percent of the population is less than six years of age. The average literacy rate of Joda is 72.16%, which is lower than the national average literacy rate i.e. 72.87%. Out of it, the male literacy rate is 80% while in Joda the female literacy rate is 63%.According to sources, these towns have 45% to 48% Scheduled Tribes and Scheduled Castes populations.

Joda has a diversified population, inside the Tata Steel township people from various regions of India can be found. They have different cultural, ethnic, religious and language background. So this city has a beautiful cosmopolitan culture.

Languages
Main language spoken here is Odia. Earlier the Joda area has been dominated by tribal (Adivasi), local people used to speak in the Ho language (it is written with the "Varang Kshiti", also "Warang Chiti" script) as their mode of communication in past.

As demographics changed due to development, now most people can speak, write all three languages Odia, Hindi & English.

Civic administration and utilities

Joda city is managed by Joda Municipal Council. The city is divided into 14 wards for which elections are held every 5 years and councilors for each ward are elected. The councilors elect the Chairman of the Municipal Council.

Joda Municipality has total administration over 10,643 houses to which it supplies basic amenities like water and sewerage. It is also authorize to build roads within Joda Municipality limits and impose taxes on properties coming under its jurisdiction.

The city is managed by Joda Municipal Council, but many of the town services are provided by Tata Steel as most of the wards are colonies of Tata Steel employees.

Economy
Joda's economy is mostly based on large-scale Steel producers, such as Tata Steel, Jindal Steel and SAIL.

Industries

This region has some of the richest iron deposits in India, and as a result of this many steel plants such as TISCO (Renamed Tata Steel Ltd) and Rourkela Steel Plant have their Mineral Processing Plants around Joda region. There are also  many other big industries related to steel manufacturing such as Essel Mining And Industries Ltd. of Aditya Birla Group, Bhushan steel, Jindal Steel and many more. At present a number of Sponge Iron Plants have also come up in its periphery due to cheap availability of raw material and labor.

Tata Steel has a Ferro Alloys Plant at Joda and number of mines of Iron & Manganese in the Joda namely Joda East Iron Mine, Khondbond Iron Mine, Katamati Iron Mine, etc. Joda East Iron Mine is the biggest mine the Joda region. There is a big sponge iron plant at Bileipada (8 km from Joda) of Tata Sponge Iron Ltd (subsidiary of Tata Steel Ltd).

Transport

It is well connected by railway with the railway station named Banspani. The railway line between Barbil (a town 13km away from Joda) and Kolkata. Daily train started between Banspani (Railway station of Joda) and Puri (via Keonjhar, Cuttack, Bhubaneswar city). The city is also well connected by daily bus services to all the major cities of Odisha and other states like Jharkhand & West Bengal.

Hotels and restaurants

There are many hotels and restaurants available in the city.
 Hotel Valley
 Hotel New Navrang
 Hotel Baidyanath
 Hotel View Point
 Hotel Lao Palace
 Hotel Marriot International
 Hotel Tanya
 Puja Lodge
 Kamal Lodge

Financial services

All the major nationalized and private banks have their branches available in the city.
 State Bank of India
 Bank of India
 HDFC Bank
 IDBI BANK
 Andhra Bank
 IndusInd Bank 
 Bank of Baroda
 Axis Bank
 Syndicate Bank
 Canara Bank
 Keonjhar Co-operative Bank
 Baitarani Gramya Bank

Tourist attractions

In Joda there are many parks and gardens developed by Tata Steel. The city has been divided into two regions based on settlements established by the Tata Steel company—Joda East and Joda West. There are also many other tourist attraction around Joda. 
 Dorabjee Tata Botanical Park (Joda West)
 Tata Centenary Park (Joda East)
 Tata Water Harvesting Park (Joda East)
 Joda View and Helipad (Joda West)
 Murga Mahadev Temple and Falls 
 Handi Bhanga Water Falls
 Bileipada Park and Shiv Mandir
 Jagannath Temple (Joda East)
 Gundicha Temple and Hanuman statue (Joda West)
 Maha Laxmi Temple

Education
In education field it is one of the growing town. Many doctors, engineers and lawyers, having reputed positions in different organisations of India and abroad are from this place. 

Joda has a number of education institutions. It has various schools and colleges imparting secondary, higher secondary and University education with affiliation from ICSE, CBSE,
BSE, CHSE & North Orissa University.

Schools
 Tata DAV Public School, Joda   (CBSE)
 Times Gurukul, Joda (CBSE)
 St. Teresa School, Joda        (ICSE)
 Zee Kidzee School, Joda (ISCE) 
 Saraswati Sishu Vidya Mandir, Joda (BSE, Odisha)
 Joda West Hindi High School, Joda (BSE, Odisha) 
 Joda West High School, Joda (BSE, Odisha) 
 Joda High School, Joda         (BSE, Odisha)
 Joda Valley Girl's High School (BSE, Odisha)
 Baneikala High School, Joda    (BSE, Odisha)
 Bichakundi High School, Joda   (BSE, Odisha)
 Banspani High School, Joda (BSE, Odisha)

Colleges
 Joda Women's College, Joda (for +2 CHSE, Odisha and for +3 North Odisha University)
  Times Gurukul, Joda (up to +2, CHSE, Odisha) 
 Brihaspati Junior Science College, Joda (CHSE, Odisha)

References

Cities and towns in Kendujhar district